The Thailand men's national under-18 basketball team is the national basketball team of Thailand, governed by the Basketball Sport Association of Thailand.
It represents the country in international under-18 (under age 18) basketball competitions.

See also
Thailand men's national basketball team
Thailand women's national under-19 basketball team

References

under
Men's national under-18 basketball teams